Graphium euphratoides is a butterfly found in Mindanao in the Philippines that belongs to the swallowtail family.

Taxonomy
Originally described as Papilio antiphates Cram. Form euphratoides Eimer, 1889 this taxon has been treated as
a synonym (aberration) of  Graphium antiphates decolor Staudinger, 1888
a subspecies of Graphium euphrates Felder, 1862
a subspecies of Graphium decolor Staudinger, 1888
a species of Graphium

References

Page & Treadaway, 2003 Schmetterlinge der Erde, Butterflies of the world Part XVII (17), Papilionidae IX Papilionidae of the Philippine Islands. Edited by Erich Bauer and Thomas Frankenbach Keltern: Goecke & Evers; Canterbury: Hillside Books. 

euphratoides
Butterflies described in 1889
Butterflies of Africa